Rinat Igorevich Timokhin (born 28 February 1988) is a Russian former professional football player.

External links
 Profile by the Russian National Football League

1988 births
People from Yelets
Living people
Russian footballers
Russian Premier League players
FC Arsenal Tula players
FC Torpedo Moscow players
Association football forwards
FC Fakel Voronezh players
FC Metallurg Lipetsk players
FC Znamya Truda Orekhovo-Zuyevo players
Sportspeople from Lipetsk Oblast